The following is a list of past and current players who have played in at least one game for the Arizona Diamondbacks franchise.
Players in Bold are members of the National Baseball Hall of Fame.


A

Tony Abreu
Joel Adamson
Miguel Aguilar
Nick Ahmed
Jonathan Albaladejo
Matt Albers
Sergio Alcántara
Brandon Allen
Armando Almanza
Roberto Alomar
Brian Anderson 
Chase Anderson
Greg Aquino
Bronson Arroyo
Bryan Augenstein

B

Carlos Baerga
Jeff Bajenaru
Willie Banks
Rod Barajas
Brian Barden
Jake Barrett
Miguel Batista
Tony Batista
Trevor Bauer
Danny Bautista
Seth Beer
Heath Bell
Jay Bell
Josh Bell
Andy Benes
Yamil Benitez
Kris Benson
Brad Bergesen
Nick Bierbrodt
Willie Blair
Henry Blanco
Willie Bloomquist
Geoff Blum
Mike Bolsinger
Emilio Bonifacio
Ricky Bottalico
Michael Bourn
Blaine Boyer
Silvino Bracho
Archie Bradley
Russell Branyan
Yhency Brazobán
Brent Brede
Craig Breslow
Charles Brewer
Juan Brito
Socrates Brito
Troy Brohawn
Scott Brow
Brian Bruney
Ryan Buchter
Billy Buckner
J. B. Bukauskas
Jason Bulger
Madison Bumgarner
Enrique Burgos
Chris Burke
Sean Burroughs
Matt Buschmann
Eric Byrnes

C

Alex Cabrera
Asdrúbal Cabrera
Daniel Cabrera
Trevor Cahill
Kole Calhoun
Alberto Callaspo
Tony Campana
Chris Capuano
Luke Carlin
Dan Carlson
D. J. Carrasco
Humberto Castellanos
Alberto Castillo
Welington Castillo
Jhoulys Chacín
Andrew Chafin
Eric Chavez
Randy Choate
Bobby Chouinard
Ryan Christenson
Ryan Church
Alex Cintrón
Jeff Cirillo
Tony Clark
Taylor Clarke
Royce Clayton
Tyler Clippard
Greg Colbrunn
Josh Collmenter
Jason Conti
Ryan Cook
Patrick Corbin
Bryan Corey
Lance Cormier
Craig Counsell
Collin Cowgill
Stefan Crichton
Bobby Crosby
José Cruz Jr.
Juan Cruz
Midre Cummings
Zac Curtis
Jack Cust

D

Jamie D'Antona
Omar Daal
Casey Daigle
Jeff DaVanon
Matt Davidson
Zach Davies
Doug Davis
Brett de Geus
Eury De La Rosa
Rubby De La Rosa
Randall Delgado
David Dellucci
Sam Demel
Elmer Dessens
Chris Devenski
Doug DeVore
Edwin Diaz
Mike DiFelice
Chris Donnels
Danny Dorn
Kyle Drabek
Stephen Drew
Brandon Drury
Zach Duke
Adam Dunn
Jon Duplantier
Erubiel Durazo
Chad Durbin
J. D. Durbin
Williams Durruthy

E

Damion Easley
Adam Eaton
David Eckstein
Drew Ellis
Robert Ellis
Jake Elmore
Alan Embree
Barry Enright
Eduardo Escobar
Bobby Estalella
Shawn Estes
Johnny Estrada
Nick Evans
Dana Eveland

F

Jorge Fábregas
Stuart Fairchild
Jake Faria
Jeff Fassero
Mike Fetters
Nelson Figueroa
Steve Finley
Ben Ford
Casey Fossum
Andy Fox
Seth Frankoff
John Frascatore
Hanley Frias
Luis Frías 
Paul Fry

G

Armando Galarraga
Zac Gallen
Karim García
Jon Garland
Jerry Gil
Tyler Gilbert
Bernard Gilkey
Cole Gillespie
Kevin Ginkel
Troy Glaus
Zack Godley
Paul Goldschmidt
Edgar González
Enrique González
Luis Gonzalez
Andrew Good
Tom Gordon
Tuffy Gosewisch
Mike Gosling
Phil Gosselin
Mark Grace
Tyler Graham
Andy Green
Shawn Green
Didi Gregorius
Grayson Greiner
Zack Greinke
Jason Grimsley
Buddy Groom
José Guillén
Juan Gutiérrez
Geraldo Guzman

H

Bradin Hagens
Jake Hager
Scott Hairston
Brad Halsey
Robby Hammock
Mike Hampton
Dan Haren
Lenny Harris
Will Harris
Nick Heath
Aaron Heilman
Jeremy Hellickson
Rick Helling
Matt Herges
Chris Herrmann
David Hernandez
Liván Hernández
Orlando Hernández
Oscar Hernández
Yonny Hernández
José Herrera
Keith Hessler
John Hester
Aaron Hill
Koyie Hill
Shea Hillenbrand
Eric Hinske
Bryan Holaday
David Holmberg
Darren Holmes
Tyler Holton
Bob Howry
Ken Huckaby
Daniel Hudson
Orlando Hudson
Cooper Hummel

I

Ender Inciarte

J

Brett Jackson
Conor Jackson
Edwin Jackson
Mike Jacobs
Kevin Jarvis
Chris Johnson
Kelly Johnson
Randy Johnson
Chris Jones
Félix José
Jorge Julio

K

Matt Kata
Carson Kelly
Merrill Kelly
Buddy Kennedy
Ian Kennedy
Joe Kennedy
Dallas Keuchel
Roger Kieschnick
Byung-hyun Kim
Danny Klassen
Eric Knott
Mike Koplove
Bobby Korecky
Josh Kroeger
Zach Kroenke
Jason Kubel

L

Gerald Laird
Jake Lamb
Matt Langwell
Adam LaRoche
Wil Ledezma
Travis Lee
Dominic Leone
Domingo Leyba
Kerry Ligtenberg
Matt Lindstrom
Mark Little
Tim Locastro
Albie Lopez
Felipe López
Javier López
Rodrigo López
Yoan López
Jordan Luplow
Brandon Lyon

M

Matt Mantei
Joe Mantiply
Barry Manuel
Jason Marquis
Evan Marshall
Alfredo Marte
Andy Marte
Ketel Marte
Starling Marte
Corbin Martin
J.D. Martinez
Joe Martinez
Wyatt Mathisen
Brent Mayne
Brandon McCarthy
Jake McCarthy
Quinton McCracken
John McDonald
Brandon Medders
Humberto Mejía
Mark Melancon
Keury Mella
Hensley Meulens
Chris Michalak
Kam Mickolio
Keynan Middleton
Matt Mieske
Wade Miley
Damian Miller
Shelby Miller
Juan Miranda
Chad Moeller
Mike Mohler
Raúl Mondesí
Miguel Montero
Melvin Mora
Mike Morgan
Terry Mulholland
Kevin Mulvey
Bill Murphy
Mike Myers

N

Xavier Nady
Shane Nance
Kyle Nelson
Wil Nieves
Dustin Nippert
Jordan Norberto
Vladimir Nuñez
Vidal Nuño

O

Peter O'Brien
Trent Oeltjen
Augie Ojeda
Gregg Olson
Tim Olson
Eddie Oropesa
Russ Ortiz
Lyle Overbay
Chris Owings
Micah Owings

P

Jordan Pacheco
Vicente Padilla
Jarrod Parker
Gerardo Parra
Jose Parra
Joe Paterson
John Patterson
Xavier Paul
Matt Peacock
Jailen Peguero
Tony Peña
Wily Mo Peña
Cliff Pennington
David Peralta
Geraldo Perdomo
Óliver Pérez
Yusmeiro Petit
Ricky Pickett
Dan Plesac
A. J. Pollock
Sean Poppen
Dante Powell
Martín Prado
Bret Prinz
J.J. Putz

Q

Chad Qualls
Carlos Quentin

R

Brady Raggio
J. C. Ramirez
Noé Ramirez
Henry Ramos
Stephen Randolph
Cody Ransom
Jon Rauch
Robbie Ray
Addison Reed
Josh Reddick
Nolan Reimold
Dennys Reyes
Mark Reynolds
Matt Reynolds
Shane Reynolds
Armando Reynoso
Saul Rivera
Ryan Roberts
Connor Robertson
Mike Robertson
Félix Rodríguez
Rafael Rodríguez
Chaz Roe
Josh Rojas
Jamie Romak
Alex Romero
Carlos Rosa
Leo Rosales
Cody Ross
Paul Rottman
Ryan Rowland-Smith
Johnny Ruffin
Rusty Ryal
Rob Ryan
Josh Rojas

S

Erik Sabel
Donnie Sadler
Takashi Saito
Jeff Salazar
Jarrod Saltalamacchia
Duaner Sánchez
Reggie Sanders
Joe Saunders
Max Scherzer
Curt Schilling
Daniel Schlereth
Konrad Schmidt
Scott Schoeneweis
A.J. Schugel
Bo Schultz
Mike Schultz
Jean Segura
Scott Service
Richie Sexson
Bryan Shaw
Tony Sipp
Brandyn Sittinger
Tyler Skaggs
Doug Slaten
Aaron Small
Caleb Smith
Jason Smith
Pavin Smith
Riley Smith
Chris Snyder
Clint Sodowsky
Joakim Soria
Juan Sosa
Steve Sparks
Junior Spivey
Russ Springer
Zeke Spruill
Daniel Stange
Andy Stankiewicz
Kelly Stinnett
Matt Stites
Todd Stottlemyre
Jeff Suppan
Anthony Swarzak
Greg Swindell

T

Amaury Telemaco
Luis Terrero
Joe Thatcher
Alek Thomas
Yasmany Tomás
Chad Tracy
Mark Trumbo

U

Edwin Uceta
Justin Upton

V

César Valdez
Efrain Valdez
José Valverde
Josh VanMeter
Claudio Vargas
Ildemaro Vargas
Daulton Varsho
Esmerling Vásquez
Javier Vázquez
Brandon Villafuerte
Óscar Villarreal
Luis Vizcaíno
Stephen Vogt
Ed Vosberg

W

Tyler Wagner
Christian Walker
Turner Ward
Luke Weaver
Brandon Webb
Neil Weber
Allen Webster
Rickie Weeks
Jordan Weems
J. B. Wendelken
Ryan Wheeler
Devon White
Josh Whitesell
Bob Wickman
Taylor Widener
Matt Williams
Dontrelle Willis
Bobby Wilson
Josh Wilson
Bobby Witt
Bob Wolcott
Tony Womack
Tim Worrell

Y

Alex Young
Andrew Young
Chris Young
Ernie Young

Z

Mike Zagurski
Clay Zavada
Brad Ziegler
Alan Zinter

External links
BR batting statistics
BR pitching statistics

Major League Baseball all-time rosters
Roster